Karbon may refer to:

 Denise Karbon (born 1980), Italian skier
 Fadel Karbon (born 1992), Norwegian footballer
 Karbon (software), vector graphic editor
 Karbon, Iran, a village in Mazandaran Province, Iran
 Siah Karbon, village in Iran

See also
 Korban, sacrificial offerings in Judaism
 Carbon (disambiguation)